A number of steamships have been named Elisabethville.

, torpedoed and sunk in 1917
, scrapped in 1960

See also
, built 1949, gutted by fire in 1968 and scrapped in 1969

Ship names